Ursula "Ulla" Knab (22 November 1929 in Heidelberg – 23 May 1989 in Karlsruhe) is a German athlete who competed mainly in the 100 metres.

She competed for West Germany in the 1952 Summer Olympics held in Helsinki, Finland in the 4 x 100 metres where she won the silver medal with her teammates Helga Klein, 80 metre hurdles bronze medalist Maria Sander and Marga Petersen.

References

1929 births
1989 deaths
West German female sprinters
Olympic athletes of West Germany
Athletes (track and field) at the 1952 Summer Olympics
Medalists at the 1952 Summer Olympics
Sportspeople from Heidelberg
Olympic silver medalists in athletics (track and field)
Olympic silver medalists for Germany
Olympic female sprinters